Joseph Adrien Germain Gagnon (December 9, 1942 – October 26, 2014) was a Canadian professional ice hockey player who played 259 games in the National Hockey League. He played for the Montreal Canadiens, New York Islanders, Chicago Black Hawks, and Kansas City Scouts. An original Islander, Gagnon recorded three points, including the winning goal, in the Islanders first win on October 12, 1972. The full name was found in his Baptism document. Gagnon returned to Chicoutimi and died there after a long illness on October 26, 2014.

Career statistics

Regular season and playoffs

References

External links

1942 births
2014 deaths
Canadian ice hockey left wingers
Chicago Blackhawks players
French Quebecers
Houston Apollos players
Hull-Ottawa Canadiens players
Ice hockey people from Quebec
Kansas City Scouts players
Memphis South Stars players
Montreal Canadiens players
Montreal Junior Canadiens players
Montreal Voyageurs players
New Haven Nighthawks players
New York Islanders players
Nova Scotia Voyageurs players
Omaha Knights (CHL) players
Providence Reds players
Quebec Aces (AHL) players
Sportspeople from Saguenay, Quebec
Springfield Indians players
Vancouver Canucks (WHL) players